The Mitsogo or Tsogo are an ethno-cultural group from the highlands of Gabon. They reside mainly in Ngounié Province to the north and east of Mouila. Numbering around 13,000, they speak the Tsogo language. In the late 19th and early 20th century they were known for their fierce resistance to the French.

Description
There are about 13,000 Mitsogo people who speak the Tsogo language. They reside mainly in Ngounié Province in southern-central Gabon, to the north and east of Mouila. The region is named after the major river, Ngounié River, a tributary of the Ogooué River, and is so associated with the Mitsogo that it is often referred to as "Mitsogo country". It is sometimes also known as Mitsogo. Roughly 90% of them are Christian.

History
The French first encountered the Mitsogo people in 1857, when they totalled approximately 5000 people. They become known for their skills in iron and cloth manufacturing. In the 1890s the Tsogo-speaking clans of the Matèndè, Dibuwa, and Waka districts along the Ikoy River clashed with Kele invaders. The Kele took their women and children to increase their own numbers and fertility. As a result, Mitsogo clans settled in districts inhabited by Punu and Apindji speaking clans.

In 1899, the French established a military outpost and Roman Catholic mission in the region and the Mitsogo people came fully under their control. In the early 20th century the Mitsogo the conflicted with the Bakele people. They put up a strong resistance in 1907, with the Mitsogo-Kamba clan fighting a fierce battle with the Bakele near Mount Motende. The conflict solidified Tsogo identity. The Mitsogo chief Mbombe was particularly known for his freedom fighting against the French. One major uprising broke out in 1904. He was eventually captured in 1913 and executed at the prison in Mouila.

See also
Beti-Pahuin peoples

References

Bantu peoples
Ethnic groups in Gabon